The League of Legends: Season 2 World Championship was an esports tournament for the multiplayer online battle arena video game League of Legends, held from October 4 to October 13, 2012, in Los Angeles, California. It was the second iteration of the League of Legends World Championship, an annual international tournament organized by the game's developer, Riot Games. The tournament was won by Taipei Assassins who defeated Azubu Frost 3–1 in the final.

Background 

After Season 1, Riot announced that 5,000,000 would be paid out over Season 2. Of this $5 million, $2 million went to Riot's partners including the IGN Pro League and other major esports associations. Another $2 million went to Riot's Season 2 qualifiers and championship. The final $1 million went to other organizers who applied to Riot to host independent League of Legends tournaments.

The Season 2 World Championship was held in early October 2012 in Los Angeles, California to conclude the 5 million season. Twelve qualifying teams from around the world participated in the championship, which boasted the largest prize pool in the history of e-sports tournaments at the time at 2 million, 1 million going to the champions, until The International 2013 beat it the next year. The group stage, quarterfinal, and semifinal matches took place between October 4 and 6. The grand final took place a week after, on October 13 in the University of Southern California's Galen Center in front of 10,000 fans, and were broadcast in 13 different languages. In the grand final, Taiwan's professional team Taipei Assassins triumphed over South Korea's Azubu Frost 3-to-1 and claimed the 1 million in prize money.

Over 8 million viewers tuned in to the Season 2 World Championship broadcast, with a maximum of 1.1 million concurrent viewers during the grand final, making the Season 2 World Championship the most watched esports event in history at the time.

Controversies

Format
Several top teams missed out on the World Championship, including S1 champions Fnatic and Azubu Blaze. (Till 2022, Fnatic had only missed the Worlds for two times, the second was in 2016.)

Cheating incident 
During the quarterfinal round of the Season 2 World Championship, Jang Gun Woong of team Azubu Frost cheated by turning his head to look at the big screen which was positioned behind him. The screen, which presents an overview of the game, is meant to be watched only by the crowd, as it displays elements that are supposed to be hidden from the players inside the game. This led to Azubu Frost being fined 30,000.

Technical issues 
During the last quarterfinal best-of-three match on October 6 between European team Counter Logic Gaming EU and Chinese team Team WE, multiple technical difficulties occurred. Roughly twenty minutes into the second game, the network connection in the arena went down, terminating the live stream on Twitch and disconnecting all ten players from the game, forcing a remake of the game. Then, roughly sixty minutes into the third game, the network went down again. A final attempt was made at finishing the third game, but due to more network outages and technical issues, including a player's defective computer which had to be replaced, the last game and the following semifinals were rescheduled to be played on October 10 in the Galen Center, which was still undergoing construction work. The cause of the connection issues is uncertain, but is suspected to have been caused by faulty hardware. This incident,which was called "拔网线"(lit:unplugging the network cable) by many Chinese LoL fans,was seemed as a conspiracy that denied Team WE from winning the championship, whom later won the IPL5 by beating Azubu Blaze, Moscow Five, CLG Europe and Fnatic.

Qualification 
The Participants qualified through the Regional Finals: 
 
 China: July 26 – Shanghai, China at China Joy – 2 teams
 Europe: August 16 – Cologne, Germany at Gamescom – 3 teams
 North America: August 30 – Seattle, United States at PAX Prime – 3 teams
 Taiwan/Hong Kong/Macau: September 1 – Taipei, Taiwan at G1 – 1 team
 Southeast Asia: September 9 – Da Nang, Vietnam at Tien Son Sports Palace – 1 team 
 South Korea: September 21 – Seoul, Korea at the OGN eSports Stadium – 2 teams

Team 
Of the five first seeds of five regions (China, Europe, North America, South Korea, Taiwan/Hong Kong/Macau) a random drawing was done to determine which four teams skip the group stage

 The random drawing determined that Azubu Frost would go to the Group stage while the others received a bye

Group stage 
 Eight teams are drawn into two groups with four teams in each group based on their seeding. Teams of the same region cannot be placed in the same group.
 Single round robin, all matches are best-of-one.
 If teams have the same win–loss record and head-to-head record, a tiebreaker match is played for first or second place.
 Top two teams of each group will advance to Playoff stage. Bottom two teams are eliminated.

Group A

Group B

Knockout stage 

 Eight teams are drawn into a single elimination bracket.
 All matches are best-of-three, except for the final match which is best-of-five.
 The auto-qualified team is drawn against the team from Group stage.
 Teams from same group will be on opposite sides of the bracket, meaning they cannot play each other until the final.

Final standings

Team ranking

Top four

References

2012 in esports
2012 in Los Angeles
2012 in sports in California
2012 multiplayer online battle arena tournaments
International esports competitions hosted by the United States
2012 League of Legends World Championship